In the United Kingdom, the Government Operational Research Service (GORS) supports and champions Operational Research across government. GORS currently supports policy-making, strategy and operations in many different departments and agencies across the United Kingdom and employs around 500 analysts, ranging from sandwich students to members of the Senior Civil Service.

References

Operations research
Research institutes in the United Kingdom
Government of the United Kingdom
Government research